Punk Is Dead or Punk's Dead may refer to:

 Punk's Dead, a 2015 American comedy/drama film directed by James Merendino
 "Punk Is Dead", a song by Crass
 "Punk's Dead, Let's Fuck", a track on the EP Punk's Dead Let's Fuck and the album We Are Fuck You by the Finger
 "Punk Is Dead", a track on Rocketfuel by Peter Pan Speedrock.

See also
 Punks Not Dead
 The Only Good Punk... Is a Dead One